This is a list of banks in the Netherlands.

Central bank

De Nederlandsche Bank

Development Bank
FMO (Netherlands)

Major banks

ABN Amro
ING Group
Rabobank
De Volksbank

Smaller banks

Amanah Group Holdings
Anadolubank Nederland N.V.
Bank Mendes Gans (cash management)
Bank Nederlandse Gemeenten (financing for (semi-)publicly owned organisations)
BinckBank (electronic trading platform)
Bunq
Credit Europe Bank
Demir Halk Bank (commercial bank)
Friesland Bank (retail bank)
GarantiBank International NV
GE Artesia Bank
Kempen & Co (merchant bank)
Knab
Nederlandse Waterschapsbank (financing for (semi-)publicly owned organisations)
Netherlands Development Finance Company (development bank)
NIBC Bank (commercial bank)
Regiobank
Triodos Bank
Van Lanschot Kempen (private bank)
Yapi Kredi Bank Nederland N.V.

Foreign banks
Amsterdam Trade Bank
Argenta
Commerzbank AG
Deutsche Bank
N26
Revolut 
Royal Bank of Scotland
TransferWise

Defunct banks

Amstelbank
1921: Founded.
1947: Liquidated.

Amsterdamsche Goederenbank
Head office: Amsterdam (1940-1954). 
Successor to: Amsterdamsche Liquidatiekas (1888-1940).
Possibly merged with or acquired by Escomptobank in 1954.

Bank voor Nederland en de Koloniën
Head office: Amsterdam
1914: Founded.
1926: Liquidated.

Escomptobank

Defunct banks now part of ABN Amro Group
 
Algemene Bank Nederland merged into ABN AMRO in 1991
AMRO Bank merged into ABN AMRO in 1992
Amsterdamsche Bank merged into AMRO Bank in 1964
Fortis Bank Nederland merged into ABN AMRO in 2010
Rotterdamsche Bank merged into AMRO Bank in 1964

Defunct banks now part of De Volksbank

ASN Bank 
SNS Bank

See also
Financial history of the Dutch Republic
History of banking
List of banks in Europe

External links
List of Dutch banks with SWIFT codes and contact information
Banks of the Netherlands
Netherlands banks, their offices with locations and working hours and SWIFT codes.

References

 
Netherlands
Netherlands
Banks, defunct
Netherlands banks